Yiling Senior High School is a public secondary school in Yichang, Hubei, China.

Established in 1962, the school covers 90,000 square meters with a floor area of 40,000 square meters. The school consists of four  main parts: teaching and living areas, a playground, and a Baicao Garden.   The school has been successively evaluated as a Key High School and a Demonstrative School of the Hubei Province. 

The school currently has 45 classes with 181 teachers and 2800 students.

References

External links

1962 establishments in China
Educational institutions established in 1962
High schools in Hubei
Yichang